The Grenada School District is a public school district based in Grenada, Mississippi (USA). The district's boundaries parallel that of Grenada County.

Schools
Grenada High School (Grades 9-12)
Grenada Middle School (Grades 6-8)
Grenada Elementary School — Green Top (Grades 4-5)
Grenada Elementary School — Red Top (Grades PreK-3)
Tie Plant School (alternative)
Grenada Adult Education Center (Adult Literacy, Adult Basic Education, English-as-a-Second Language, GED Testing)

Historical schools
Before racial integration, GSD operated a second set of schools for African-American students to attend. Those schools included:

Rebecca Reed School
Tie Plant School
Willie Wilson Elementary School
Carrie Dotson High School

Demographics

2006-07 school year
There were a total of 4,753 students enrolled in the Grenada School District during the 2006–2007 school year. The gender makeup of the district was 50% female and 50% male. The racial makeup of the district was 50.94% African American, 48.33% White, 0.17% Hispanic, 0.36% Asian, and 0.21% Native American. 55.2% of the district's students were eligible to receive free lunch.

Previous school years

Accountability statistics

See also

List of school districts in Mississippi

References

External links
 

Education in Grenada County, Mississippi
School districts in Mississippi